The 2002 Molson Indy Montreal was the thirteenth round of the 2002 CART FedEx Champ Car World Series season, held on August 25, 2002 at Circuit Gilles Villeneuve in Montreal, Quebec, Canada.  It was the first Champ Car event to take place on the circuit best known for hosting the Formula One Canadian Grand Prix.

Qualifying results

Race

Caution flags

Notes 

 New Track Record Cristiano da Matta 1:18.959 (Qualification Session #2)
 New Race Lap Record Dario Franchitti 1:20.238
 New Race Record Dario Franchitti 1:59:40.938
 Average Speed 108.648 mph

References

External links
 Friday Qualifying Results
 Saturday Qualifying Results
 Race Results

Montreal
Montreal
Grand Prix of Montreal